The ice hockey competition at the 2019 Southeast Asian Games in the Philippines was held at the SM Mall of Asia Skating Rink in Pasay, Metro Manila from 1 to 8 December 2019.

Like in the previous edition, only a men's competition was held. Malaysia has requested the Philippines to introduce a women's ice hockey event to the games. The hosts complied with Malaysia's request but a total of three nations only expressed their interest to participate in a women's tournament a team short in order for women's hockey to be a medal event.

Participating nations

Competition schedule
The following is the competition schedule for the ice hockey competition

Competition format
The tournament had a single round robin format for the group phase with the top four teams advanced to the semifinals. The winning teams of the two semifinals contested the gold medal while the losing teams played against each other to determine the bronze medalist team.

Group stage

All times are Philippine Standard Time (UTC+8)

Knockout stage

Bracket

Semifinals

Bronze medal game

Gold medal game

Medalists

References

External links
 

2019
2019 Southeast Asian Games events
Southeast Asian Games
Southeast Asian Games
International ice hockey competitions hosted by the Philippines